The 2009 NCAA Division I baseball season, play of college baseball in the United States organized by the National Collegiate Athletic Association (NCAA) at the Division I level, began on February 20, 2009.  The season progressed through the regular season, many conference tournaments and championship series, and concluded with the 2009 NCAA Division I baseball tournament and 2009 College World Series.  The College World Series, which consisted of the eight remaining teams in the NCAA tournament, was held in its annual location of Omaha, Nebraska, at Rosenblatt Stadium.  It concluded on June 24, 2009, with the final game of the best of three championship series.  LSU defeated Texas two games to one to claim their sixth championship.

Realignment

New programs
Five new programs joined Division I for the 2009 season.  Three programs, Bryant, North Dakota, and SIU Edwardsville, joined from Division II.  The two other Division I members, Oregon and Cal State Bakersfield, were new varsity baseball programs.

Dropped programs
Hawaii-Hilo, which had competed as a Division I independent, dropped to Division II.

Conference changes

The Big South Conference added two new members.  Gardner–Webb, previously of the Atlantic Sun Conference, and Presbyterian, previously a Division I independent, both joined the conference.

Two conferences add a single member.  Oregon's new program joined the Pacific-10 Conference.  Samford left the Ohio Valley Conference to join the Southern Conference.

Four schools became Division I independents− Bryant, from the Division II Northeast-10 Conference; North Dakota, from the Division II North Central Conference; SIU Edwardsville, from the Division II Great Lakes Valley Conference; and Cal State Bakersfield, in its first season of varsity intercollegiate baseball.

Preseason rankings
After a 49–19 season in 2008, the LSU Tigers were ranked #1 prior to the season. Defending World Series champion Fresno State was ranked #19.

Conference standings

Key

College World Series

The 2009 season marked the sixty third NCAA Baseball Tournament, which culminated with the eight team College World Series.  The College World Series was held in Omaha, Nebraska.  The eight teams played a double-elimination format, with LSU claiming their sixth championship with a two games to one series win over Texas in the final.

Bracket

Award winners

All-American teams

Major player of the year awards
Dick Howser Trophy: Stephen Strasburg, San Diego State
Baseball America: Stephen Strasburg, San Diego State
''Collegiate Baseball: Stephen Strasburg, San Diego StateAmerican Baseball Coaches Association: Mike Leake, Arizona StateGolden Spikes Award Stephen Strasburg, San Diego State

Major coach of the year awardsAmerican Baseball Coaches Association: Paul Mainieri, LSUBaseball America: Paul Mainieri, LSUCollegiate Baseball Coach of the Year: Paul Mainieri, LSU

Other major awardsJohnny Bench Award (Catcher of the Year): J. T. Wise, OklahomaBaseball America'' Freshman Of The Year: Anthony Rendon, Rice

References 

Warrennolan Standings (Archived 2009-08-01)
NCAA-Baseball.com (Archived 2009-08-01)